Melvin Jalka King (born November 18, 1985) is a Liberian former footballer who last played for Sekondi Hasaacas F.C.

Career 
On 17 December 2008, King was banned for 5 months from all games due to doping.

International 
He was also a member of the Liberia national football team.

References

External links 

1985 births
Living people
Liberian footballers
Liberian expatriate footballers
Liberia international footballers
Liberian expatriate sportspeople in Ivory Coast
Association football goalkeepers
Expatriate footballers in Ivory Coast
Séwé Sport de San-Pédro players
Invincible Eleven players
Doping cases in association football